Standards for Better Health were a set of standards for the National Health Service in England.  The standards were set out by the Department of Health of the United Kingdom in a document of the same name published in 2004.  NHS trusts had to declare their level of compliance with these standards to the Healthcare Commission annually as part of the Commission's "annual health check".  The standards were replaced from 2009/10 by registration criteria established by the Department of Health and Care Quality Commission, which took over from the Healthcare Commission on 1 April 2009.

Domains

The standards were listed under seven headings or "domains", three of which focused on "patient experience":

Safety
Clinical and cost effectiveness
Governance (both clinical governance and corporate governance)
Patient focus
Accessible and responsive care
Care environment and amenities
Public health

Standards

The standards were divided into 24 core and 13 developmental standards.  Compliance with the core standards had always been mandatory but the approach taken by the Department of Health and Healthcare Commission with respect to the developmental standards varied.

References

National Health Service